Shih Keh-her is a politician of the Republic of China. He is currently the Deputy Minister of Labor since October 2017.

Education
Shih obtained his bachelor's degree in political science from National Taiwan University. He then obtained his master's degree in regional and urban planning from London School of Economics and Political Science and master's in business administration from Imperial College London in the United Kingdom.

References

Living people
Alumni of Imperial College London
National Taiwan University alumni
Taiwanese Ministers of Labor
Year of birth missing (living people)